Masso may refer to:

Masso River, a river in Guam
 Masso, Burkina Faso, town in Burkina Faso
A prefix to denote massage-related activity
 Masso (surname), surname

See also  

 Massa (disambiguation)